Warslow Athletic Club (also formally known as the Whitestone Warslows and the Warslow Indians) were an early amateur, and later professional, American football team. The club, based on Long Island, is best remembered for playing in the 1902 World Series of Football, played at Madison Square Garden. During the Series, the club played the Knickerbocker Athletic Club in a hard fought 11–6 loss and was eliminated from the competition.

The team claimed to be the "New York Independent Football Champions" in 1900 and 1901. Over the span of its history, the team's name changed several times. In 1933, the club took to the field as the Whitestone American Legion, while a year later they were called the Columbia Dems. After a 4-year hiatus, they finally fielded one final team, called the simply the Warslows.

References

Early professional American football teams in New York (state)
1894 establishments in New York (state)
1939 disestablishments in New York (state)
World Series of Football (1902–03)
Defunct American football teams in New York (state)
American football teams in the New York metropolitan area
 Athletic Club football teams and seasons